Yodocheon (요도천 / 堯渡川) is a river of South Korea. It is a river of the Han River system. The Yodocheon located in the province of North Chungcheong Province , in the central part of the country, 100 km south-east of the capital city Seoul.

References

Rivers of South Korea